A v Bottrill [2002] UKPC 44 is a cited case in New Zealand regarding the awarding of exemplary damages.

Background

Dr Bottrill was a pathologist in Gisborne. Due to his negligence, he misread A's slides for cervical cancer, resulting in her delaying her treatment.

Barred by ACC law from pursuing Bottrill in court for ordinary damages for her suffering, A instead sued him for exemplary damages, which is a far higher standard to meet.

Her High Court claim in 1999 was dismissed, as well as her subsequent appeal to the Court of Appeal.

Decision

The Privy Council upheld her appeal, and referred the matter back to court. The appeal was helped by new evidence of Dr Bottrill's negligence.

Footnote: Subsequent to her 1999 claim being dismissed, it was discovered that Bottrill had misread numerous other people's slides, causing a national uproar, resulting in a Commission of Inquiry.

References

Judicial Committee of the Privy Council cases on appeal from New Zealand
New Zealand tort case law
2002 in New Zealand law
2002 in case law